Coronation Street is a British television soap opera first broadcast on ITV on 9 December 1960. The following is a list of characters who currently appear in the programme, listed in order of first appearance.

Present characters

Regular characters

Recurring and guest characters

Cast changes

Future characters

Former characters

Lists of characters by year of introduction

 1960
 1961
 1962
 1963
 1964
 1965
 1966
 1967
 1968
 1969
 1970
 1971
 1972
 1973
 1974
 1975
 1976
 1977
 1978
 1979
 1980
 1981
 1982
 1983
 1984
 1985
 1986
 1987
 1988
 1989
 1990
 1991
 1992
 1993
 1994
 1995
 1996
 1997
 1998
 1999
 2000
 2001
 2002
 2003
 2004
 2005
 2006
 2007
 2008
 2009
 2010
 2011
 2012
 2013
 2014
 2015
 2016
 2017
 2018
 2019
 2020
 2021
 2022
 2023

Notes

References

External links
 Cast and characters at itv.com
 Cast and characters at the Internet Movie Database